Aix-les-Bains, Savoie, France had a race track, called Circuit du Lac, which hosted Formula 2, Formula Junior, and Motorcycle Grand Prix races between 1949 and 1960.

Introduction

The Circuit du Lac d'Aix-les-Bains (the lake race track) was in and nearby the Lac du Bourget next to the French commune of Aix-les-Bains. Its length, was typical of city race tracks. A slightly different track was reported to be in use in 1953. It was the sole race track in Savoie - the nearest others were Geneva's Circuit des Nations, Lausanne's Circuit du Léman, and at Lyon. Many drivers and spectators attended from neighboring Switzerland and Italy, and even from the UK.

Racing events

Automobile

1949 1st Grand Prix du Lac (Formula 2) 

 winner Eugène Martin with a Jicey-BMW,
 followed by Ernesto Tomqvist with a Simca Gordini T11
 and René Bonnet with a DB Citroën
 best lap: Maurice Trintignant, 1min 19sec

1950 2nd Grand Prix du Lac (Formula 2)

 winner Raymond Sommer with a Ferrari 166 F2,
 followed by André Simon with a Simca Gordini T16
 and Maurice Trintignant with a Simca Gordini T16
 best lap: Harry Schell, 1min 20sec .4"

1951 3rd Grand Prix du Lac (Formula 2)

 winner Rudolf Fisher (CH) with a Ferrari 212/166,
 followed by Stirling Moss (GB) with an HWM Alta 
 and André Simon with a Simca Gordini T16
 best lap: Rudolf Fischer, 1min 17sec .3"

1952 4th Grand Prix du Lac (Formula 2)

 winner Jean Behra with a Gordini T16,
 followed by Lance Macklin with an HWM Alta F2
 and Emmanuel de Graffenried with Maserati-Plate 4CLT/48
 best lap: Robert Manzon, 1min 36sec .4"

1953 5th Grand Prix du Lac (Formula 2)
 winner Élie Bayol with an Osca 20,
 followed by Louis Rosier with a Ferrari 500
 and Lance Macklin with an HWM 53 Alta.
 best lap: Jean Behra, 1min 20sec

1960 Circuit Prix du Lac (Formula junior)
 The race had to be stopped after the collapse, on the race track, of a bridgeway built for the media and the organizing committee. This led to the crash of the ELVA of Chris Threlfall in the remains of the structure, killing him on the spot as well as 4 other spectators. The race was cancelled without results being published.

This will be the last event on this race track....

Motorcycle
 In 1950: winner in 125cc : Jacques Vaque with MV Agusta, in 350cc : Georges Monneret  with  AJS, in 500cc : Nello Pagani, (Italy) with Gilera and in sidecar : Hans Haldemann / Josef Albisser, (Switzerland) with Norton.
 In 1951: winner in 350cc : Werner Gerber (Switzerland) on  AJS, in 500cc : Werner Gerber (Switzerland) on  Gilera and in sidecar : Eric Oliver / Lorenzo Dobelli, (UK/Italy) on  Norton.

 In 1952 : winner in 350cc : Werner Gerber (Switzerland) on  AJS, in  500cc : Werner Gerber (Switzerland) on  AJS and in  sidecar : Jacques Drion / Bob Onslow, (UK) on  Norton.
 In 1953 : winner in 175cc : Gaston Gaury on  Morini, in  350cc : Pierre Monneret on  AJS, in  500cc : Giuseppe Colnago, (Italy) on  Gilera and in  sidecar : Eric Oliver / Stan Dibben, (UK) on  Norton.
 In 1954 : winner in 175cc : René Bétemps on  MV Agusta, in  350cc : Luigi Taveri, (Switzerland) on  Norton, in  500cc : Werner Gerber, (Switzerland) on  Norton, and in  sidecar : Hans Haldemann / Luigi Taveri, (Switzerland) on  Norton.
 In 1955 : the accident in Le Mans will cause many event cancellations.
 In 1956 : new safety rules prevent old tracks being used without major safety modifications.
 In 1960 : the race is canceled because of a Formula Junior accident which happened four days earlier.
 In 1961 : the event is canceled.

References

External links
  Aix les Bains and motorsports 
  The legend of the Circuit du Lac; 2004 Revival of the Crand Prix du Lac
   GP moto in France 

Auto races in France
Aix-les-Bains
Sports venues in Savoie
Defunct motorsport venues in France